The Guhilas of Medapata colloquially known as Guhilas of Mewar were a Rajput dynasty that ruled the Kingdom of Mewar (Medapata, modern Mewar) region in present-day Rajasthan state of India. The Guhila kings initially ruled as Gurjara-Pratihara feudatories between end  of 8th and 9th  centuries and later were independent in period of  the early 10th century and allied themselves with the Rashtrakutas. Their capitals included Nagahrada (Nagda) and Aghata (Ahar). For this reason, they are also known as the Nagda-Ahar branch of the Guhilas.

The Guhilas assumed sovereignty after the decline of the Pratiharas in the 10th century under Rawal Bharttripatta II and Rawal Allata. During the 10th-13th centuries, they were involved in military conflicts with several of their neighbours, including the Paramaras, the Chahamanas, the Delhi Sultanate, the Chaulukyas, and the Vaghelas. In the late 11th century , the Paramara king Bhoja interfered in the Guhila throne possibly deposing a ruler and placing some other ruler of the branch.

In the mid-12th century, the dynasty divided into two branches. The senior branch (whose rulers are called Rawal in the later medieval literature) ruled from Chitrakuta (modern Chittorgarh), and ended with Ratnasimha's defeat against the Delhi Sultanate at the 1303 Siege of Chittorgarh. The junior branch rose from the village of Sisodia with the title Rana and established the Sisodia Rajput dynasty.

Origin 

The history of the Guhilas has been obscured by bardic legends. In the 7th century, three different Guhila dynasties are known to have ruled in present-day Rajasthan in Nagda-Ahar, Kishkindha (Kalyanpur) and Dhavagarta (Dhor). None of these dynasties claimed any prestigious origin in their 7th century records. The Guhilas of Dhavagarta explicitly mentioned the Mori (later Mauryas) kings as their overlords, and the early kings of the other two dynasties also bore the titles indicating their subordinate status.

By the 10th century, the Guhilas of Nagda-Ahar were the only among the three dynasties to have survived. By this time, their political status had increased, and the Guhila kings had assumed high royal titles such as Maharajadhiraja. During this period, the dynasty started claiming a prestigious origin, stating that its founder Guhadatta was a Brahmin who had migrated from Anandapura (present-day Vadnagar in Gujarat). The 977 CE Atpur inscription of Shaktikumara lists 20 Guhila kings in an unbroken line of succession, starting with Guhadatta and ending with Shaktikumara.

By the 13th century, having consolidated their rule over the Medapata (Mewar) region, the Guhilas came up with a new origin myth. Their post-13th century records and the subsequent bardic legends name the dynasty's founder as Bappa Rawal, who is not mentioned in the Atpur inscription. These accounts state that Bappa Rawal consolidated his rule with the blessings of the Pashupata sage Haritarashi. Different historians identify Bappa Rawal with different kings mentioned in the Atpur inscription, including Kalabhoja, Shiladitya, and Khummana. R. C. Majumdar theorizes that Bappa achieved a highly significant military success, because of which he gained reputation as the dynasty's founder.

According to 1274 CE Chittor inscription and 1285 CE Achaleshwar (Abu) inscription of Vedasharma, Bappa Rawal "changed his priestly splendour for regal lustre". Based on this, scholars such as D. R. Bhandarkar theorized that the Guhilas were originally Brahmins. G. H. Ojha, however, believed that the statement in Vedasharma's inscription is a misinterpretation of the earlier Atpur inscription. The Atpur inscription describes Guhadatta as a "Mahideva", which according to historian R. V. Somani, can be translated as either "king" or "Brahmin".

The 1274 CE Chittor inscription compares the Guhila ruler Bharttripatta with Rama, describing both of them as "Brahma-Kshatras". Based on the identification of Rama with Parashurama, scholars such as D. C. Sircar theorized that the progenitor of the dynasty had a Brahmin parent and a Kshatriya parent. However, Somani dismisses this theory, arguing that Rama here refers to Ramachandra, from whose solar dynasty the later Guhilas claimed descent.

The later bardic chronicles mention a fabricated genealogy, claiming that the dynasty's founder Guhaditya was a son of Shiladitya, the Maitraka ruler of Vallabhi. This claim is not supported by historical evidence.

History 

R. C. Majumdar places Guhadatta in the 5th century CE, assuming a 20-year reign for each generation. R. V Somani places him somewhere before the first quarter of the 6th century.

According to the 977 CE Atpur inscription and the 1083 CE Kadmal inscription, Guhadatta was succeeded by Bhoja, who commissioned the construction of a tank at Eklingji. The 1285 CE Achaleshwar inscription describes him as a devotee of Vishnu. Bhoja was succeeded by Mahendra and Nagaditya. The bardic legends state that Nagaditya was killed in a battle with the Bhils.

Nagaditya's successor Shiladitya raised the political status of the family significantly, as suggested by his 646 CE Samoli inscription, as well as the inscriptions of his successors, including the 1274 CE Chittor inscription and the 1285 CE Abu inscription. R. V. Somani theorizes that the copper and zinc mines at Jawar were excavated during his reign, which greatly increased the economic prosperity of the kingdom. The 16th century Buddhist writer Taranatha mentions a reputed artist named Shringadhara, who was patronized by the king Shila of Maru country. Somani identifies this king as the Guhila king Shiladitya, although some other historians have identified him as Harshavardhana or the Maitraka king Shiladitya.

Shiladitya was succeeded by Aparajita, who is attested by the 661 CE Kunda inscription. This epigraph records the construction of a Vishnu temple by Yashomati, the wife of Aparajita's commander Varaha. According to the bardic chronicles, Aparajita was also killed in a battle with the Bhils. His son Mahendra succeeded him.

Mahendra was succeeded by Kalabhoja, who has been identified as Bappa Rawal by several historians including G. H. Ojha.

The Guhilas originally acknowledged the suzerainty of the Gurjara-Pratiharas. In the 10th century, Bharttripatta II became an independent ruler, and assumed the title Maharajadhiraja, as attested by a 943 CE inscription. His successor Allata (reigned c. 950s CE) killed one Devapala, who according to Majumdar, might have been the Gurjara-Pratihara king Devapala.

Guhilas of Ahar 
Towards the end of the 10th century, Ahar became the second capital of the Guhilas.

In the later half of the 10th century, the Paramara king Munja defeated the elephant forces of the Guhilas, and plundered their capital Ahar. The defeated Guhila ruler (either Naravahana or his son Shaktikumara) took shelter with Dhavala, the Rashtrakuta ruler of Hastikundi. As a result of this victory, the Paramaras gained control of the eastern part of Mewar, including Chittorgarh.

Shaktikumara's son Ambaprasada was defeated and killed by the Chahamana king Vakpati II. Among his successors, Vijayasimha (r.c. 1108–1116) was a son-in-law of the Paramara king Udayaditya and a father-in-law of the Kalachuri king Gayakarna.

Rawal branch 

According to the 15th century text Eklinga-Mahatmaya, the family split into two branches during the reign of Ranasimha alias Karna: the Rawal (senior) branch of Chittor, and the Rana (junior) branch of Sisoda. The later Sisodia Rajput dynasty of Sesoda thus descended from the Guhilas of Mewar.

Kshemasimha succeeded his father Ranasimha alias Karna. By 1151, Chittor was under the control of the Chaulukya king Kumarapala. Kshemasimha's son Samantasimha appears to have achieved military success against Kumarapala's successor Ajayapala. However, he was defeated by Ajayapala's feudatory Prahladana, the Paramara chief of Abu. The 1231 CE Abu prashasti inscription states that Prahladana defended the Gurjara king (that is, Ajayapala) after Samantasimha had broken the king's power on the battlefield.Shortly later, the Naddula Chahamana king Kirtipala, who was also a Chaulukya feudatory, ousted Samantasimha from Mewar. Kirtipala probably launched this invasion during 1171-1179 CE, with the approval of his Chaulukya overlord. By 1182, Samantasimha's younger brother Kumarasimha regained the control of his ancestral kingdom by appeasing the Chaulukya king. This Chaulukya king was probably Ajayapala or his successor Mularaja II. After losing his ancestral realm, Samantasimha established new branch of the Guhilas in the area of Vagad. However, he was displaced from Vagad by Solanki Bhima II in 1185 CE or thereabouts. He was aided by Sambhar-Ajmer ruler Prithviraja III with whom he fought against the Ghurid conqueror Mu'izz al-Din Muhammad ibn Sam in a battle near Taraori.

Kumarasimha was succeeded by Mathanasimha, Padmasimha and Jaitrasimha.

Jaitrasimha 

During the reign of Jaitrasimha (r. c. 1213–1252), the Guhilas achieved a high political status. He fought with multiple rulers like Turushkas at Naddula which was possible held by Ghurid dynasty who captured it from Chauhans, Tribhuvana-Ranaka (identified with the Chaulukya king Tribhuvanapala) at Kottadaka, Iltutmish invaded Mewar, and destroyed Nagada. His relatives also possibly fought with Panchalagudika Jaitramalla.

The Guhila records also credit him with military success against the king of Shakambhari. The rulers of Shakambhari had already ended by this time, therefore, this may be a reference to the Chahamanas of Ranthambore. Jaitrasimha is also said to have defeated the Sindhuka army, whose identity is uncertain.

Decline 
Jaitrasimha's son Tejasimha ascended the throne sometime before 1260. The earliest Guhila inscription discovered at Chittor is from Tejasimha's reign, and refers to "Chitrakuta-maha-durga" (the great fort of Chittor).

Tejasimha's son Samarasimha succeeded him sometime during 1267–1273. He defeated Krishnaraja, a ruler of the Paramara branch of Abu. He lost control of Abu soon, when Krishnaraja's son Pratapasimha, supported by the Vaghela king Sarangadeva, conquered it during 1285–1287. Sometime before 1285, Samarasimha helped Sarangadeva repulse a Turushka (Turkic) invasion of Gujarat (possibly a Delhi Sultanate army during Balban's reign). His Chirwa inscription states that he "like unto the primaeval boar [...] in a moment lifted the deeply sunk Gurjara land out of the Turushka sea". Towards the end of the 13th century, when Alauddin Khalji's army invaded Gujarat, Samarasimha saved his kingdom by paying a tribute.

The Rawal branch ended when Ratnasimha was defeated by Alauddin Khalji in the Siege of Chittorgarh (1303). The Rana branch survived in form of the Sisodia dynasty which continued to rule Mewar till Independence of India from British control.

Genealogy 

Different sources offer different lists of the Guhila kings. The earliest extant inscription that provides a genealogy of the dynasty is the 971 CE inscription of Naravahana. However, it is badly damaged, and only three names can be read: Guhila, Bappa and Naravahana.

The following inscriptions are the major sources of the dynasty's genealogy:

 Atpur (Ahar) inscription, 977 CE (1034 VS) of Śaktikumāra
 Chittor inscription, 1274 CE (1331 VS) of Samarasiṃha
 Abu (Achaleshvar) inscription, 1285 CE (1342 VS) of Samarasiṃha
 Sadadi (Ranpur) inscription, 1439 CE (1496 VS) of Kumbhakarna of Rana (Sisodia) branch
 Kumbhalgarh inscription, 1460 CE (1517 VS) of Kumbhakarna of Rana (Sisodia) branch

Early kings 

The following table lists the early kings of the dynasty, as given in the various inscriptions.

Post-split Rawal branch 

After Raṇasiṃha, the dynasty split into the Rawal branch and the Rana branch. The following is a list of the rulers of the Rawal branch. Except Ratnasiṃha, all these rulers are mentioned in Abu, Sadadi, and Kumbhalgarh inscriptions. Ratnasiṃha is mentioned only in the Kumbhalgarh inscription.

The 1439 Sadadi inscription of Kumbhakarna lists the following five rulers as Samarasiṃha's successors: Bhuvanasiṃha, Jayasiṃha, Lakṣmasiṃha, Ajayasiṃha, and Arisiṃha. These names are followed by that of Hammīra and other his Sisodia successors. These names are also mentioned in the text Ekalinga Māhātmya (also called Ekalinga Purāṇa). However, these rulers actually belonged to the Rana branch of the family.

The 1460 Kumbhalgarh inscription of Kumbhakarna states that after Ratnasiṃha departed from the battlefield (during the 1303 Siege of Chittor), Lakshmasiṃha of the Rana branch died fighting to defend the fort.

Rana branch 
{
	"type": "FeatureCollection",
	"features": [
		{
			"type": "Feature",
			"properties": { "marker-symbol": "monument", "title": "Ahar" },
			"geometry": { "type": "Point", "coordinates": [73.719444, 24.587778] }
		},
		{
			"type": "Feature",
			"properties": { "marker-symbol": "monument", "title": "Nagda" },
			"geometry": { "type": "Point", "coordinates": [76.265291, 25.165124] }
		},
		{
			"type": "Feature",
			"properties": { "marker-symbol": "monument", "title": "Chittor" },
			"geometry": { "type": "Point", "coordinates": [74.626922, 24.888744] }
		},
		{
			"type": "Feature",
			"properties": { "marker-symbol": "monument", "title": "Sisoda" },
			"geometry": { "type": "Point", "coordinates": [73.740431, 25.005169] }
		}
	]
}
Rahapa, a son of Ranasimha alias Karna, established the Rana branch. According to the 1652 Eklingji inscription, Rahapa's successors were:

 Narapati
 Dinakara
 Jasakarna
 Nagapala
 Karnapala
 Bhuvanasimha
 Bhimasimha
 Jayasimha
 Lakhanasimha
 Arisimha (Arasi)
 Hammira (Hammir Singh)

Hammir Singh re-established the families rule over Mewar under the title of Rana.

For Sisodia successors of Hammir Singh, see Ranas of Mewar.

References

Bibliography 

 
 
 
 
 
 
 
 
 
 
 
 
 

Dynasties of India
History of Rajasthan
Dynasties of the Rajputs
Rajput rulers